Paul Haeberlin may refer to:

 Paul Häberlin (1878–1960), Swiss philosopher
 Paul Haeberlin (chef) (1923–2008), French chef and restaurateur